The Hagerup's Second Cabinet governed Norway between 22 October 1903 and 11 March 1905. It fell as the cabinet ministers collectively resigned on 28 February and 1 March 1905, as part of the build-up for the dissolution of the union between Norway and Sweden in 1905. Christian Michelsen withdrew his application, and could form the cabinet Michelsen. It had the following composition:

Cabinet members

|}

State Secretary
Not to be confused with the modern title State Secretary. The old title State Secretary, used between 1814 and 1925, is now known as Secretary to the Government (Regjeringsråd).

Halfdan Lehmann

References
Francis Hagerup's Second Government. 22 October 1903 - 11 March 1905 - Government.no

Notes

Hagerup 2
Hagerup 2
Hagerup 2
Hagerup 2
1903 establishments in Norway
1905 disestablishments in Norway
Cabinets established in 1903
Cabinets established in 1905